AMC Networks International Central Europe (formerly Chello Central Europe) is a Budapest, Hungary-based television company, owned by AMC Networks International.

It operates 30 channels in Albania, Bosnia and Herzegovina, Bulgaria, Croatia, Czech Republic, Estonia, Germany, Hungary, Latvia, Lithuania, Montenegro, Poland, Romania, Serbia,  Slovakia, Slovenia and Ukraine.

Channels
 AMC (Hungary, Czech Republic, Slovakia, Romania, Bulgaria, Serbia, Croatia)
 Film Mania (Hungary)
 Film Cafe (Hungary, Romania)
 Film+ (Czech Republic, Slovakia)
 JimJam
 Kinowelt TV  (Germany)
 Minimax (Hungary, Czech Republic, Slovakia, Romania, Moldova, Serbia)
 Megamax  (Hungary, Czech Republic, Slovakia, Romania)
 Sport 1 (Hungary, Czech Republic, Slovakia)
 Sport 2  (Hungary, Czech Republic, Slovakia)
 Sport M (Hungary)
 Spektrum (Hungary, Czech Republic, Slovakia)
 Spektrum Home (Hungary, Czech Republic, Slovakia)
 TV Paprika (Hungary, Czech Republic, Slovakia, Romania)
 Sundance TV (Slovenia, Croatia, Serbia, Bosnia and Herzegovina, Montenegro, Bulgaria, Greece, Cyprus, Malta)

Logos

References

External links
AMC Networks International

AMC Networks
Central Europe
Mass media companies of Hungary
Mass media in Budapest